Reem Island is a natural island located  off the coast of the Abu Dhabi island. It is a mixed-purpose community with residential, retail, and commercial units. As of 2015, Al Reem Island's population is at 13,941 people with the population density being 1,579/km².

Development 
Sorouh Real Estate (now merged with Aldar Properties PJSC), Reem Investments, and Tamouh are independently developing parts of the island with projects like Shams Abu Dhabi. Reem Developers define the overall dimensions of the project as 2 meters square meters and investment costs as exceeding $30 billion. The project is a free zone, where foreign nationals can buy property on a 50-year leasehold basis.

The handing over of units in Al Reem Island was significantly delayed due to a couple of reasons but during the first quarter of 2011, the handing over process began.

In March 2013, Repton announced that it would be opening a campus in Al Reem Island, and opened its first location in 2013 and a second location in 2014.

Districts 

 Tamouh
 Najmat
 Shams

Sub-districts 

 The Gate District, Shams
 City of Lights, Tamouh

Landmarks

Popular 

 The Gate Towers
 Reem Central Park
 Shams Boutik
 Repton Abu Dhabi
 Sorbonne University Abu Dhabi

Others 

Paragon Bay Mall
Reem Hospital
Gateway Park
Al Fay Park
Burjeel Day Surgery Center - Al Reem Island
Reem Mall (Partially Open)

Upcoming/Planned 

 Reem Hills

References

Buildings and structures under construction in Abu Dhabi
Islands of the Emirate of Abu Dhabi
Central Region, Abu Dhabi